Cunningham Drug Stores Ltd. (Cunningham's for short) was a regional pharmacy chain based in British Columbia, Canada.

History
Cunningham's was established in February 1911 when New Westminster native George Cunningham, a druggist formerly employed by the Woodwards department store chain, opened his first store in Vancouver, at the corner of Denman and Nelson Streets. Cunningham expanded his chain in September 1939 when he acquired the Vancouver Drug Stores chain, nearly tripling the size of the Cunningham's chain from 12 stores to 35.

At its peak, 100 drug stores in British Columbia and Alberta bore the Cunningham's name. Cunningham was a Vancouver city councilor from 1955 to 1957 and served as chair of the University of British Columbia Board of Governors.

Cunningham died in Palm Springs, California on March 7, 1965, at age 76, and the drug store chain bearing his name was sold to the expanding Shoppers Drug Mart on September 26, 1971.

References

Canadian pharmacy brands
Retail companies established in 1911
Defunct retail companies of Canada
Retail companies disestablished in 1971
1911 establishments in British Columbia
1971 disestablishments in British Columbia
Canadian companies disestablished in 1971
Canadian companies established in 1911